Jane Elizabeth Parker (born 1960) is a British scientist who researches the immune responses of plants at the Max Planck Institute for Plant Breeding Research.

Education and early life
Jane Elizabeth Parker was born in 1960 in Great Britain and completed her undergraduate degree at the University of Bradford in applied Biology in 1983. She went on to earn her PhD in 1986 from Swansea University on protein synthesis in Euglena.

Career and research
Following her PhD, she was a postdoctoral researcher at the Max Planck Institute for Plant Breeding Research. Throughout the 1990s, she worked at the Sainsbury Laboratory at the John Innes Centre in the Norwich Research Park, at Norwich, England, but left in August 2001, with her husband, Dr. George Coupland to take up a post as an independent researcher at Cologne's Max Planck Institute.

In 2002, Parker was awarded a Sofja Kovalevskaja Prize to continue her research into plant immune responses. She researches how plants defend themselves from disease-causing microorganisms. Her work involves isolating the genes which trigger innate defence mechanisms and combines genetics with molecular biology to evaluate how plants are able to avoid disease. Her research has discovered that there are multiple layers of defence but that a protein, called EDS1, which combines with other proteins to form complexes, is the initial trigger. The immune response varies depending on whether the complex formed is developed from combining with the protein PAD4 or SAG101 to initiate the response to disease resistance.

Since 2009, Parker has been an associate professor at the Institute of Genetics University of Cologne in Germany. In 2013, she was elected a member of the Academy of Sciences Leopoldina. She is widely published and has been listed on the annual ISI Web of Knowledge most highly cited scientists for 2015, as published by Thomson Reuters.

Selected publications
The following were noted as the five most important works by Parker, according to Cluster of Excellence on Plant Sciences, a German scientific research organisation group:

Awards and honours
She is listed on Thomson Reuters' list of the annual ISI Web of Knowledge most highly cited scientists for 2015. She was elected a member of the European Molecular Biology Organization in 2016.

References 

1960 births
Living people
British botanists
Alumni of the University of Bradford
Alumni of the University of Wales
Max Planck Society people
Academic staff of the University of Cologne
Members of the European Molecular Biology Organization
21st-century British women scientists
20th-century British women scientists
British women non-fiction writers
Members of the German Academy of Sciences Leopoldina